Drango is a 1957 American Western film produced by Jeff Chandler's production company Earlmar Productions, written and directed by Hall Bartlett, and released by United Artists. Starring Chandler in the title role, the film also features Ronald Howard, Joanne Dru, Julie London and Donald Crisp. Set in the town of Kennesaw, Georgia in the months immediately following the American Civil War, the story depicts the efforts of a resolute Union Army officer who had participated in the town's destruction during Sherman's March determined to make amends.

Plot

Union officers Major Drango and Captain Banning ride into Kennesaw Pass, Georgia, at the end of the Civil War; a town ravaged by the war, particularly during Sherman's March to the Sea, its citizens are still bitter about the lives and property lost. Drango is the new military governor, but townspeople including Judge Allen and his son Clay make it clear that these Yankees are not welcome.

A local man seen as disloyal to the Confederacy, set to be tried by Drango's demand for a recent killing, is lynched after the townspeople refuse to serve as jurors. The man's daughter, Kate Calder, blames Drango for letting it happen, while Judge Allen is distraught by how justice has utterly failed his town.

Drango attempts to bring the men responsible to justice, but wealthy citizen Shelby Ransom harbors the fugitives, including her lover Clay. A doctor and newspaper editor offer Drango their support in restoring order. Colonel Bracken from nearby Fort Dalton finds fault with Drango for not being tough enough, so he confiscates the town's food supply and rations it. Clay's men stage a raid. The doctor is wounded during Clay's raid, the newspaper office is set ablaze and the editor's young son is accidentally killed.

Despite the revelation to the townspeople that the root of Drango's presence in Kennesaw Pass is to atone for his part in Sherman's march, Drango's fairness and honesty in his command during the Union rationing over time has won him some more support within town, including Kate Calder. An angered Shelby tries to order Clay from her home, but he slaps her and makes her lure the absent Captain Banning to an ambush. Drango, away from town pleading his case to Colonel Bracken, returns to find Banning, killed in Clay's ambush, being laid to rest by several townspeople; the ambush an unfortunate success.

The judge confronts his son over his unlawful acts, as Clay now aims to lay siege to Fort Dalton, but Clay refuses to listen. In a desperate last stand to stop open revolt, Drango stands in the street, only to be shot and injured for his defiance. But Clay in turn is shot and killed by his own father (who earlier said he would rather see his own son killed in the street than wage war against the Union), restoring law and order to the town. Drango and several townspeople, ally and not, depart for Fort Dalton to end the rationing in a peaceful way.

Cast
Jeff Chandler as Major Clint Drango 
Joanne Dru as Kate Calder 
Julie London as Shelby Ransom 
Donald Crisp as Judge Allen 
Ronald Howard as Clay Allen 
John Lupton as Capt. Marc Banning 
Walter Sande as Dr. Blair 
Milburn Stone as Col. Bracken 
Morris Ankrum as Henry Calder 
Parley Baer as George Randolph, Daily Herold 
Damian O'Flynn as Gareth Blackford 
Barney Phillips as Rev. Giles Cameron 
Charles Horvath as Ragan 
Katherine Warren as Mrs. Scott 
Chubby Johnson as Zeb 
David Stollery as Jeb Bryant 
Edith Evanson as Mrs. Blackford 
Anthony Jochim as Stryker the School Teacher 
Amzie Strickland as Mrs. George Randolph 
Mimi Gibson as Ellen Bryant 
Helen Wallace as Mrs. Allen 
Paul Lukather as Burke 
Bing Russell as Lieutenant with Supply Wagon 
Chuck Webster as Boy with Chicken 
David Saber as Tommy Randolph 
Phil Chambers as Luke 
James Murphy as Bartender 
Rex Allen as Himself – Singer of Title Song (voice)

Production
The film was made by Jeff Chandler's own production company, Earlmar, for United Artists. It was meant to be the first of a six-picture deal Earlmar had with United, with Chandler to star in three of them. The film was a co-production with the production company of Hal Bartlett, who wrote the script.

Chandler had risen to fame playing Cochise in Broken Arrow. "It's no Indian story", said Chandler, "let Cochise rest in peace."

Half the movie was shot on location in the south; filming started in St Francisville in June 1956.

Ronald Howard made his American debut in the film. Linda Darnell signed to play the female lead, with Donald Crisp and Julie London in support. Darnell had to pull out because of a virus and she was replaced with Joanne Dru.

Follow Up
The second film Chandler was meant to make for United Artists was Lincoln McKeever, based on a novel by Eliezar Lipsky about a frontiersman appointed to the Supreme Court.

See also
 List of American films of 1957

References

External links
 
 
 

1957 films
1957 drama films
American Civil War films
American drama films
American black-and-white films
Films scored by Elmer Bernstein
Films set in Georgia (U.S. state)
United Artists films
Films directed by Hall Bartlett
American Western (genre) films
1957 Western (genre) films
1950s English-language films
1950s American films